This is a list of films which placed number one at the weekend box office for the year 2008.

Number-one films

Most successful films by box office admissions

Most successful films of 2008 by number of movie tickets sold in Austria.

See also
 Cinema of Austria

References 

Austria
2008